The women's team pursuit in the 2011–12 ISU Speed Skating World Cup was contested over four races on four occasions, out of a total of seven World Cup occasions for the season, with the first occasion taking place in Chelyabinsk, Russia, on 18–20 November 2011, and the final occasion taking place in Berlin, Germany, on 9–11 March 2012.

Canada won the cup, while Russia came second and South Korea came third. The defending champions, Netherlands, ended up in 6th place.

Top three

Race medallists

Standings 
Standings as of 11 March 2012 (end of the season).

References 

Women team pursuit
ISU